Macropomoides is an extinct genus of lobe-finned fish which lived during the Cretaceous period.

References 

Prehistoric lobe-finned fish genera
Latimeriidae
Cretaceous bony fish
Cretaceous fish of Europe
Fossil taxa described in 1942
Cretaceous genus first appearances
Cretaceous genus extinctions